Alloeorhynchus is a genus of damsel bugs in the family Nabidae. There are at least 4 described species in Alloeorhynchus.

Species
 Alloeorhynchus flavipes (Fieber, 1836)
 Alloeorhynchus maculosus Kerzhner, 1992
 Alloeorhynchus nigrolobus Barber, 1922
 Alloeorhynchus trimacula (Stein, 1857)

References

 Thomas J. Henry, Richard C. Froeschner. (1988). Catalog of the Heteroptera, True Bugs of Canada and the Continental United States. Brill Academic Publishers.

Further reading

External links

 NCBI Taxonomy Browser, Alloeorhynchus

Nabidae